The World Rowing Junior Championships is an international rowing regatta organized by FISA (the International Rowing Federation).  A rower or coxswain shall be classified as a Junior until 31 December of the year in which he reaches the age of 18. After that date, he shall be classified as an Under 23 rower. During Olympic years it is held at the same location as the Senior World Rowing Championships.

The first FISA Youth Regatta was held in 1967 and has been held every year since then, being raised to the status of FISA Junior Champs in 1970 and Junior World Champs in 1985.

Many European countries send athletes not up to the standard for World Championships to the Coupe de la Jeunesse.

Venues

Medal table
As of 2022.

References

 
Rowing competitions
World youth sports competitions
Recurring sporting events established in 1967